José Maria Pinto Sousa Ribeiro da Cunha (born 27 March 2001), known as José Cunha, José da Cunha,  or Zé Maria, is a Portuguese footballer who plays as a defender.

Early life
Cunha began playing at age three. He joined the famed Sporting CP Youth Academy, before moving on to the youth system of G.D. Estoril Praia, where he captained the U17 and U19 teams. He briefly played for Union FC in Bradford, Ontario in 2018 during their 2018 NCAA March Break Tour, where they played against NCAA college teams Akron, Maryland, and Georgetown.

University career
Cunha had initially attended the Universidade NOVA de Lisboa in Portugal, while playing in the top division U19 division in Portugal, but decided to send game tapes to universities in Canada and the United States. He made the decision to come to North America, as he wanted to pursue education and football simultaneously, which was not really viable to do in Portugal. Cape Breton University in Sydney, Nova Scotia, Canada became interested in him and he decided to attend there and play for their Capers soccer team beginning in the 2020-21 year. However, he was unable to make his debut for the Capers due to the season being cancelled due to the COVID-19 pandemic. He made his debut on 11 September 2021 against the Saint Mary's Huskies. He scored his first goal on 23 October against the Mount Allison Mounties, scoring the first goal in a 10-0 victory. In 2021, he was named the AUS Rookie of the Year and was named an AUS First-team All-Star, was named to the national U Sports All-Rookie Team, during the Capers' AUS Championship winning season, progressing to the National Championships where they won the bronze medal.

Club career
In 2020, Cunha began playing for Estoril Praia's B team in the district league, fifth tier.

At the 2021 CPL-U Sports Draft, he was selected ninth overall by Forge FC of the Canadian Premier League, but did not ultimately sign with them for the 2021 season.

At the 2022 CPL-U Sports Draft, he was selected first overall by Atlético Ottawa, with the pick being announced by Atlético Madrid and Portugal national team player João Félix. On April 1, he signed a Canadian Premier League developmental contract with Atlético Ottawa. He made his professional debut on 24 April against Valour FC. He left the club in early August to return to university, as part of his developmental contract.

Honours

Atlético Ottawa 
 Canadian Premier League
Regular Season: 2022

Career statistics

References

External links
CBU Capers profile
Zé Maria Stats at ZeroZero

2001 births
Living people
Sportspeople from Cascais
Association football defenders
Portuguese footballers
Portuguese expatriate footballers
Expatriate soccer players in Canada
Canadian Premier League draft picks
Canadian Premier League first-overall draft picks
Canadian Premier League players
Forge FC draft picks
G.D. Estoril Praia players
Cape Breton Capers soccer players
Atlético Ottawa players